Qaralar-e Kuh (also Romanized as Qarālar-e Kūh; also known as Qarahlar-e Gūrkhāneh) is a village in Baranduzchay-ye Shomali Rural District, in the Central District of Urmia County, West Azerbaijan Province, Iran. At the 2006 census, its population was 226, in 64 families.

References 

Populated places in Urmia County